Renee Gittins is an American game developer, Executive Director of the International Game Developers Association (IGDA) from July 2019, succeeding Jennifer MacLean. She also serves as Creative Director at her indie game studio, Stumbling Cat, which is developing the game Potions: A Curious Tale.

Biography 
Renee Gittins is the daughter of Carol Gittins and the Olympian, Boyd Gittins. She received her degree in engineering from Harvey Mudd College in May 2012 and worked in biotechnology prior to joining the game industry.

Prior to her appointment as executive director, Gittins served on the IGDA's executive board as secretary  and started her company, Stumbling Cat, in 2014. As Executive Director, Gittins promised to focus on sustainable careers and inclusion within the game industry, and has taken a strong stance against the significant overtime hours worked within the game industry.

Gittins was named as part of the Forbes 30 Under 30 class of 2020 in Games.

References

Year of birth missing (living people)
Living people
Women video game developers
Harvey Mudd College alumni
Indie video game developers
Date of birth missing (living people)
Place of birth missing (living people)